John Flowers may refer to:

 Jackie Flowers (born 1958), American football player
 John Flowers (cricketer) (1882–1968), English cricketer
 Johnny Flowers, American baseball player
 John Flowers (footballer) (born 1944), English footballer
 John Flowers (politician) (born 1954), Australian politician
 John Flowers (basketball) (born 1989), American basketball player

See also
 John Flower (disambiguation)